Vera Lapko and Polina Monova were the defending champions, but Lapko chose not to participate. Monova partnered Olga Doroshina, but lost in the first round to Anna Kalinskaya and Viktória Kužmová.

Kalinskaya and Kužmová won the title after defeating Petra Krejsová and Jesika Malečková 7–6(7–5), 6–1 in the final.

Seeds

Draw

Draw

References
Main Draw

Engie Open de Seine-et-Marne - Doubles